Charles Tait (February 1, 1768 – October 7, 1835) was a United States senator from Georgia and a United States district judge of the United States District Court for the District of Alabama, the United States District Court for the Northern District of Alabama and the United States District Court for the Southern District of Alabama.

Education and career

Born on February 1, 1768, near Hanover, Hanover County, Colony of Virginia, British America, Tait moved to Georgia in 1783 with his parents, who settled near Petersburg. He completed preparatory studies, then attended Wilkes Academy in Washington, Georgia from 1786 to 1787, and Cokesbury College in Abingdon, Maryland in 1788. He was a Professor of French at Cokebury College from 1789 to 1794. He read law in 1795 and was admitted to the Georgia bar. He was rector and professor at Richmond Academy in Augusta, Georgia from 1795 to 1798. He entered private practice in Elbert County and in Lexington, Georgia from 1798 to 1803. He owned slaves. He was a Judge of the Superior Court of Georgia for the Western Judicial Circuit from 1803 to 1809.

Congressional service

Tait was elected as a Democratic-Republican to the United States Senate from Georgia to fill the vacancy caused by the resignation of United States Senator John Milledge, winning election by one vote. He was reelected in 1813 and served from November 27, 1809, to March 3, 1819. He was Chairman of the United States Senate Committee on Naval Affairs for the 14th and 15th United States Congresses. Following his departure from Congress, he moved to Wilcox County, Alabama in 1819.

Federal judicial service

He was confirmed by the United States Senate on May 13, 1820, and received his commission the same day. His service terminated on February 1, 1826, due to his resignation.

Later career and death

In 1827, Tait was elected to the American Philosophical Society. Following his resignation from the federal bench, Tait was engaged as a planter near Claiborne, Alabama. He declined a mission to Great Britain in 1828. He died on October 7, 1835, near Claiborne. He was interred in Dry Forks Cemetery on his country estate in Wilcox County.

References

External links
 [Letter] 1814 Jan. 26, Washington, [D.C. to] David B. Mitchell, Milledgeville, Georgia / Cha[rle]s Tait
 Troup-Clarke Political Feud historical marker

Sources

 

1768 births
1835 deaths
People from Hanover, Virginia
Virginia colonial people
American people of English descent
Democratic-Republican Party United States senators from Georgia (U.S. state)
Georgia (U.S. state) state court judges
Judges of the United States District Court for the District of Alabama
Judges of the United States District Court for the Southern District of Alabama
Judges of the United States District Court for the Northern District of Alabama
United States federal judges appointed by James Monroe
United States federal judges admitted to the practice of law by reading law
American slave owners
People from Wilcox County, Alabama
Politicians from Augusta, Georgia
People from Elbert County, Georgia
19th-century American judges
United States senators who owned slaves